Nephelochloa is a genus of flowering plant in the grass family, Poaceae. The only known species is Nephelochloa orientalis, found only in Turkey.

formerly included
see Eremopoa Sphenopus 
 Nephelochloa altaica - Eremopoa altaica 
 Nephelochloa breviglumis - Sphenopus divaricatus 
 Nephelochloa persica - Eremopoa persica  
 Nephelochloa songarica - Eremopoa altaica 
 Nephelochloa tripolitana - Eremopoa persica

References

Pooideae
Monotypic Poaceae genera
Taxa named by Pierre Edmond Boissier